¡García! (or García!) is a Spanish television series based on the graphic novel by Santiago García and Luis Bustos. Created by Sara Antuña and Carlos de Pando for HBO Max, it stars Francisco Ortiz and Veki Velilla. Eugenio Mira directed the 6 episodes.

Premise 
Set in a version of current-day Spain on the verge of societal collapse, the fiction follows Antonia, a reporter who accidentally unravels a decades-old plot concerning a super-agent created in the 1950s by the Francoist secret services, García, who was subsequently cryogenized. The latter, defrosted by Antonia, finds himself dazed and confused in current-day Spain.

Cast

Production 
Created and written by Sara Antuña and Carlos de Pando (showrunners of The Neighbor), ¡García! is an adaptation of the eponymous graphic novel by Santiago García and Luis Bustos. The series is produced by García La Serie, S.L. (an ad-hoc production company linked to Zeta Studios) for WarnerMedia Original Programming.

The project, billed as a "satirical thriller with sci-fi elements", was greenlighted in May 2021. Miguel Salvat, Steve Matthews and Antony Root are credited as executive producers, whereas Eugenio Mira was charged with the direction of the 6 episodes comprising the season, set to feature a running time of around 60 minutes.  is the cinematography director. Shooting in Madrid had already begun on 7 May 2021.

Still in production, the project was showcased together with other HBO Max originals (Todo lo otro, Venga Juan and Sin novedad) at the 69th San Sebastián International Film Festival in September 2021. On 25 October 2021, HBO Max released a teaser video, announcing an intended release date for 2022.

Release 
The first two episodes made their world premiere at the Fantastic Fest in September 2022. They also screened at the 55th Sitges Film Festival. HBO Max released the first two episodes in 4K along with Dolby Vision and Dolby Atmos on 28 October 2022. A free-to-air release of the first episode on Spanish channel DMAX was also programmed for 28 October 2022.

Reception 
Raquel Hernández Luján of HobbyConsolas rated the show with 80 points ("very good"), praising its "agile storytelling, the committed cast, and its boundless aesthetic and musical ambition".

Pere Solà Gimferrer of La Vanguardia highlighted "an impeccable execution that knows how to recreate the adventurous spirit of Indiana Jones and the sense of action of the classic James Bond without renouncing to have its own identity".

In the United States, Deciders Johnny Loftus also wrote a positive review for the series, concluding: "Garcia! offers a gleeful riff on spy movies, and a grip of chase and fight scenes right out of the Indiana Jones adventure handbook. But it also has something to say about the shifting tides of contemporary politics, between democracy and fascism, and that push and pull isn’t exclusive to contemporary Spain."

Accolades 

|-
! rowspan="5" | 2023
| 28th Critics' Choice Awards || colspan = "2" | Best Foreign Language Series ||  || align = "center" | 
|-
| rowspan="2" | 10th Feroz Awards
| colspan = "2" | Best Drama Series
| 
| rowspan="2" | 
|-
| Best Supporting Actor in a Series
| Emilio Gutiérrez Caba
| 
|-
| rowspan = "2" | 31st Actors and Actresses Union Awards || rowspan = "2" | Best Television Actor in a Minor Role || Luis Rallo ||  || rowspan = "2" | 
|-
| Arturo Querejeta || 
|}

References

External links
 

2022 Spanish television series debuts
2020s Spanish drama television series
Spanish-language television shows
HBO Max original programming
Television shows based on comics
Television shows filmed in Spain
Television shows set in Spain
Television series by Zeta Studios
Spanish thriller television series
Political thriller television series
Fictional super soldiers
Political satirical television series
Cryonics in fiction
Spanish action television series